The 2017–18 season is Dinamo Zagreb's 27th season in the Croatian First Division and 105th year in existence as a football club.

This is the first season since 2006 that Dinamo Zagreb failed to qualify for the group stages of a European competition.

Mario Cvitanović was the manager of the club and had moved to club to 1st position, going unbeaten for 21 league games, but after two abysmal performances against rivals HNK Rijeka and feeder-club NK Lokomotiva, both of which were defeats by a score of 4–1, he ultimately resigned as manager of the club on 10 March 2018.

Nikola Jurčević then took over as head coach, returning to Dinamo, having managed them in the 2003–04 season. Dinamo confirmed the title following Rijeka and Hajduk's draws with Cibalia and Osijek, respectively. However, on 14 May, another poor form resulted in Nikola Jurčević's dismissal as manager, being head coach for just 65 days.

After much speculation, Nenad Bjelica took over as manager, signing a reported two-year contract. He won the Croatian Football Cup with the club, beating Hajduk Split in the final. This season was a major success for Dinamo, as the club won the domestic double.

On 6 June 2018, the former executive director and advisor of the club, Zdravko Mamić, was sentenced to a six-and-a-half-year prison sentence for corruption. On the same day, the club released a statement on their official website, in which they claimed that they were "shocked" with the verdict, also claiming that they "firmly believe" that Zdravko Mamić and the others who were sentenced are innocent.

Season review

Competitions

HT PrvaLiga 
15 July: Dinamo Zagreb won their first game of the season against Istra 1961 by a result of 2–0, with goals coming from defensive midfielder Nikola Moro and centre-back Filip Benković.

21 July: Dinamo Zagreb won against HNK Cibalia by a result 4–0, with a brace from centre-forward Armin Hodžić and a goal each from winger Júnior Fernándes and Ante Ćorić.

30 July: Dinamo Zagreb were held to a draw by NK Osijek in their first away game of the season, with Nikola Moro clinching a goal in a 1–1 draw.

6 August: Dinamo Zagreb won at home against old rivals Hajduk Split, by a score of 3–1. Goals from Ante Ćorić, Dani Olmo and El Arabi Hillel Soudani were enough to secure a win in the first of four meetings between the two sides.

11 August: Dinamo Zagreb beat league champions HNK Rijeka at the Stadion Rujevica by a result of 2–0 with a brace from Júnior Fernándes.

20 August: Dinamo Zagreb secure a 2–0 win over Slaven Belupo with goals from attacking midfielder Ivan Fiolić and centre-back Amir Rrahmani.

27 August: A hat-trick from El Arabi Hillel Soudani is enough to secure Dinamo Zagreb a comfortable 3–0 win over feeder-club NK Lokomotiva.

9 September: Dinamo Zagreb earn a hard-fought home win over newly-promoted NK Rudeš, with goals from Ángelo Henríquez, El Arabi Hillel Soudani and Filip Benković securing a win.

16 September: Goals from Ángelo Henríquez, El Arabi Hillel Soudani and Tongo Doumbia secure a 3–1 away win for Dinamo Zagreb against NK Inter Zaprešić.

24 September: Dinamo are held to a stalemate (0–0 draw) away to Istra 1961.

30 September: Dinamo secure a 5–2 away win against HNK Cibalia, with a brace from Dani Olmo and El Arabi Hillel Soudani and a goal from Armin Hodžić.

14 October: A last-minute equalizer from Ángelo Henríquez rescued Dinamo from their first defeat of the season against NK Osijek in a 1–1 draw.

21 October: Dinamo drew 2–2 with rivals Hajduk Split in an entertaining and dramatic match, as goals from Filip Benković in the 89th minute and Ángelo Henríquez in the 90th minute gave Dinamo a 2–1 lead before Ante Erceg struck a late equalizer in the 94th minute.

28 October: Dinamo moved 9 points clear of league champions HNK Rijeka and 7 points clear of second-placed NK Osijek at the top of the table as a goal from Nikola Moro and a brace from El Arabi Hillel Soudani sealed a 3–1 win for Dinamo against HNK Rijeka.

5 November: Dinamo won 1–0 against NK Slaven Belupo with a late goal from Amer Gojak.

26 November: Dinamo drew 1–1 with newly promoted side NK Rudeš.

3 December: Dinamo won 1–0 against Inter Zaprešić with a goal from Spanish footballer Dani Olmo.

9 December: Dinamo secured a 5–1 home win against NK Istra 1961 with goals from Nikola Moro, El Arabi Hillel Soudani, Ante Ćorić and Armin Hodžić (2).

16 December: Dinamo won 1–0 against HNK Cibalia with a goal from Ángelo Henríquez.

10 February: Dinamo won 4–2 in entertaining display against NK Osijek, with El Arabi Hillel Soudani, Arijan Ademi (2) and Dani Olmo getting on the scoresheet.

18 February: Dinamo lost 1–0 against Hajduk Split at home.

4 March: Dinamo beat Slaven Belupo by a score of 1–0, with Mario Gavranović scoring the goal.

7 March: Dinamo suffered a 4–1 defeat by HNK Rijeka, with Mario Gavranović scoring the only goal for Dinamo.

10 March: Dinamo suffered a humiliating defeat by NK Lokomotiva, their very own feeder-club, with Dani Olmo scoring the only goal for the club. Following the defeat, Mario Cvitanović resigned as manager of the club. Nikola Jurčević then took over as head coach.

17 March: Dinamo won 2–0 against NK Rudeš, with Mario Gavranović and Dani Olmo scoring.

31 March: Dinamo drew 0–0 with NK Inter Zaprešić.

8 April: Dinamo secured a 4–0 win over Istra 1961 with El Arabi Hillel Soudani, Dani Olmo, Ivan Fiolić and Mario Gavranović scoring one goal each.

14 April: Dinamo beat HNK Cibalia by a score of 2–0, with El Arabi Hillel Soudani scoring a brace.

18 April: Dinamo suffered a setback in their title chase following a surprise 1–0 home loss to NK Osijek.

22 April: Dinamo secured a 2–1 away win over rivals Hajduk Split with Mario Gavranović scoring twice.

28 April: Dinamo suffered another setback in their title chase after a 1–0 loss to HNK Rijeka at home. The Dinamo line-up and bench notably included many reserve and academy players, due to the unavailability of many first-team players because of injuries or suspensions.

4 May: Dinamo drew 2–2 with Slaven Belupo, with Mario Budimir and Filip Benković scoring a goal each for Dinamo.

8 May: Dinamo suffered their second successive defeat against feeder-club NK Lokomotiva, losing 3–1 at the Stadion Kranjčevićeva, with El Arabi Hillel Soudani scoring the only goal.

14 May: Dinamo were crowned league champions, despite losing 1–0 to NK Rudeš, but Rijeka and Hajduk's draws made it mathematically impossible for Dinamo to lose first place at the top of the league table.

19 May: Dinamo finished the season with a 3–1 win over Inter Zaprešić with El Arabi Hillel Soudani and Mario Gavranović (2) scoring the goals.

Croatian Football Cup 
20 September: Dinamo won 6–0 away to NK Borac Imbriovec in the 1st round of the Croatian Football Cup with Ivan Fiolić and Alen Jurilj scoring a brace and Dani Olmo and Armin Hodžić scoring once.

31 October: Dinamo played second-tier side NK Novigrad in the 2nd round. After the regular game ended 0–0, the match was decided on penalties. Dinamo won 3–2.

29 November: Dinamo played NK Istra 1961 and won 4–2. Ángelo Henríquez marked off a fine performance with a hat-trick.

4 April : Dinamo beat HNK Rijeka in the semi-final by a score of 3–0, with Izet Hajrović, El Arabi Hillel Soudani and Ante Ćorić scoring the goals. (The match was originally scheduled for 28 February, but due to unfavourable weather conditions, it was moved to 4 April).

23 May: Dinamo won the 2018 Croatian Football Cup Final after beating bitter rivals Hajduk Split, with Mario Gavranović scoring the only goal, although the game was controversially overshadowed by the allegedly poor refereeing decisions made by referee Mario Zebec.

Kit information
Supplier: adidas / 
Sponsor: Hrvatski Telekom

Squad information

First team squad
Note: Games played and goals scored include all competitions.

Transfers

Transfers In

Transfers Out

Competitions

Overview

Competitions

HT Prva Liga

League table

Matches

Croatian Football Cup

Matches

UEFA Europa League

Matches

Squad statistics

Appearances 
List contains only players who are currently at the club.

Goalscorers 
The list is sorted by shirt number when total goals are equal.

Clean Sheets

References

2017–18
Dinamo
Dinamo Zagreb
2017-18